Mound City is the name of several places in the United States:

 Mound City, Arkansas
 Mound City, Illinois
 Mound City National Cemetery
 Mound City, Kansas
 Mound City Township, Kansas
 Mound City, Missouri
 Mound City, South Dakota
 Mound City National Cemetery
 Big Mound City

Other things known by the moniker Mound City:
 Hopewell Culture National Historical Park, formerly designated "Mound City Group National Monument"
 The Mound City (train), operated by the Illinois Terminal Railroad between St. Louis, Missouri and Peoria, Illinois
 Mound City and Eastern Railway, in McPherson County, South Dakota
 St. Louis, Missouri, known at one time as Mound City due to the presence of several ceremonial mounds similar to the nearby Cahokia Mounds.  (The St. Louis mounds have long since disappeared, having been used as construction fill in the 19th century.)
 The Mound City Blue Blowers, a kazoo and banjo music group with several recordings in the 1930s
 USS Mound City, a gunboat used by the Union in the American Civil War